Chakkuvarakkal  is a village in Kollam district in the state of Kerala, India.

Demographics
 India census, Chakkuvarakkal had a population of 17,580 with 8465 males and 9115 females.

Around 13 km from Kottarakkara and almost same from Punalur.

References

Villages in Kollam district